Cosimo Gamberucci (8 January 1562 – 24 December 1621), a Florentine painter, was a scholar of Battista Naldini. He did not attain to great celebrity in the art, although some of his works in the churches at Florence, particularly his picture of St. Peter curing the lame Man, in San Pietro Maggiore, just amount to respectability. He also painted easel pictures, which are found in the collections at Florence.

Notes

References

 

1562 births
1621 deaths
16th-century Italian painters
Italian male painters
17th-century Italian painters
Painters from Florence